The Battle of Renfrew was fought between the Kingdom of the Isles and the Kingdom of Scotland in 1164, near Renfrew, Scotland. The men of the Isles, accompanied by forces from the Kingdom of Dublin, were commanded by Somairle mac Gilla Brigte, King of the Isles. The identity of the Scottish commander is unrecorded and unknown. Herbert, Bishop of Glasgow, Baldwin, Sheriff of Lanark/Clydesdale, and Walter fitz Alan, Steward of Scotland are all possible candidates for this position. The battle was a disaster for the Islesmen and Dubliners. Somairle was slain in the encounter, apparently by local levies, and his forces were routed.

Somairle first appears on record in the 1150s, when he is stated to have supported the cause of Máel Coluim mac Alasdair in a rebellion against Malcolm IV, King of Scotland. Máel Coluim was a member of a rival branch of the Scottish royal family, and his sons were closely related to Somairle. At about the time of the rebellion's collapse, Somairle appears to have shifted his energies from Scotland towards the Isles. In 1156, he wrested about half of the Kingdom of the Isles from his brother-in-law, Guðrøðr Óláfsson, King of the Isles. Two years later, Somairle decisively defeated Guðrøðr, gaining complete control of the kingdom.

The reasons for Somairle's invasion of Scotland are uncertain. One possibility is that he was renewing his support for the sons of Máel Coluim. Another possibility is that he was attempting to conquer the southwest part of Scotland that may have only recently fallen under Scottish royal authority. This region had previously been occupied by the Gall Gaidheil, a people of mixed Scandinavian and Gaelic ethnicity, like Somairle himself. There is reason to suspect that this region was lost to the Scots upon the collapse of Máel Coluim's rebellion, and afterwards doled out to powerful Scottish magnates in the context of Scottish consolidation. Somairle may have also invaded the region in an attempt to counter a perceived threat that the Scots posed to his authority in the Firth of Clyde. The fact that the battle is said to have been fought at Renfrew, the seat of one of Walter's lordships, could indicate that he was a specific target.

As a result of Somairle's death in battle, the Kingdom of the Isles fractured once again. Although Guðrøðr's brother, Rǫgnvaldr, is recorded to have gained power, Guðrøðr was able overcome him within the year. Upon Guðrøðr's reestablishment in the Isles, the realm was again divided between him and Somairle's descendants, in a partitioning that stemmed from Somairle's coup in 1156. The Battle of Renfrew may have been Malcolm's greatest victory. It is certainly the last major event of his reign on record.

Background

At an uncertain point in the mid twelfth century, perhaps in about 1140, Somairle mac Gilla Brigte married Ragnhildr, daughter of Óláfr Guðrøðarson, King of the Isles. This union had severe repercussions on the later history of the Kingdom of the Isles, as it gave Somairle's descendants—Clann Somairle—a claim to the kingship by way of Ragnhildr's royal descent. The year 1153 marked a watershed in the history of the Isles. Not only did David I, King of Scotland die late in May, but the thirteenth- to fourteenth-century Chronicle of Mann reports that Óláfr was assassinated in June, whilst his son, Guðrøðr, was absent in Norway. Within months of his father's assassination, Guðrøðr executed his vengeance. According to the chronicle, he journeyed from Norway to Orkney, enstrengthened by Norwegian military support, and was unanimously acclaimed as king by the leading Islesmen. He is then stated to have continued on to Mann, where he overcame three kin-slaying cousins, and successfully secured the kingship for himself.

In 1155 or 1156, the Chronicle of Mann reveals that Somairle conducted a coup against Guðrøðr, specifying that Somairle's son, Dubgall, was produced as a replacement to Guðrøðr's rule. Late in 1156, on the night of 5/6 January, Somairle and Guðrøðr finally clashed in a bloody but inconclusive sea-battle. According to the chronicle, when the clash finally concluded the feuding brothers-in-law divided the Kingdom of the Isles between themselves. Two years later, the chronicle reveals that Somairle invaded Mann and drove Guðrøðr from the kingship into exile. With Guðrøðr gone, it appears that either Dubgall or Somairle became King of the Isles. Although the young Dubgall may well have been the nominal monarch, the chronicle makes it clear that it was Somairle who possessed the real power. Certainly, Irish sources regard Somairle as a king by the end of his career.

Battle

The Battle of Renfrew is attested by sources such as: the fourteenth-century Annals of Tigernach, the fifteenth- to sixteenth-century Annals of Ulster, the twelfth-century Carmen de Morte Sumerledi, the thirteenth-century Chronica of Roger de Hoveden, the twelfth- to thirteenth-century Chronicle of Holyrood, the thirteenth- to fourteenth-century Chronicle of Mann, the twelfth- to thirteenth-century Chronicle of Melrose, the thirteenth-century Gesta Annalia I, the fifteenth-century Mac Carthaigh's Book, and the fifteenth-century Scotichronicon.

The Chronicle of Melrose reports that Somairle's forces were drawn "from Ireland and various places". Irish sources—such as the Annals of Tigernach, Annals of Ulster, and Mac Carthaigh's Book—specify that his forces consisted of men from Argyll, Kintyre, the Isles, and Dublin. Such depictions of Somairle's forces appear to reflect the remarkable reach of power that he possessed at his peak. The invasion was clearly a well-planned affair. According to the Chronicle of Mann, Somairle's invasion fleet numbered one hundred and sixty ships. If each ship carried forty to fifty combatants, Somairle may have led between six thousand and eight thousand men. Although the tallies of combatants given by mediaeval sources are generally suspect, they can be indicative of the magnitude of a force's size. The participation of Dubliners in Somairle's venture suggests that he had an alliance with the Dubliners. Specifically, he may have had a pact with either the overlord of Dublin, Diarmait Mac Murchada, King of Leinster, or else with Diarmait's own overlord, Muirchertach Mac Lochlainn, High King of Ireland.

According to the Chronicle of Mann, and the Chronicle of Melrose, Somairle's fleet made landfall at Renfrew. It is possible that the fleet specifically landed at Inchinnan, where his forces could have first engaged the Scots. The battle was evidently a fiasco for the Islesmen, with their commanding-king killed in a skirmish against local levies. The account given by Carmen de Morte Sumerledi certainly  suggests that Somairle was killed in the outset—"wounded by spear, slain by the sword"—and overcome by a hastily organised body of local defenders. As such, Somairle could have fallen in the opening encounter, with his leaderless followers giving up the fight. The account given by Carmen de Morte Sumerledi further states that Somairle's head was cut off by a priest, and presented to Herbert, Bishop of Glasgow. According to Gesta Annalia I, Somairle was killed with a son named Gilla Coluim. It is possible that this source has mistaken the latter's name for Gilla Brigte, the name that the Annals of Tigernach accords to Somairle's slain son. It is unknown if Dubgall participated in the battle.

The stated location of Renfrew could be evidence that the target of Somairle's strike was Walter fitz Alan, Steward of Scotland. The latter certainly possessed Renfrew during his career, and it is possible that it functioned as the seat of his Strathgryfe group of holdings, or even as the principal seat of his entire lordship. The leadership of the Scottish forces is uncertain. It is conceivable that the commander was one of the three principal men of the region: Herbert, Baldwin, Sheriff of Lanark/Clydesdale, and Walter. Whilst there is reason to suspect that Somairle focused his offensive upon Walter's lordship at Renfrew, it is also possible that Herbert, as Malcolm's agent in the west, was the intended target. Certainly, Carmen de Morte Sumerledi associates Herbert with the victory, and makes no mention of Walter or any Scottish royal forces. On the other hand, Baldwin's nearby lands of Inverkip and Houston were passed by Somairle's naval forces, suggesting that it was either Baldwin or his followers who engaged and overcame the invaders. In any case, the victory over the Islesmen and their allies appears to have ensured peace in Scotland for the rest of Malcolm's rule. It may have been Malcolm's greatest victory, and is certainly the last major event of his reign on record.

Context

Somairle's rise to power appears to coincide with an apparent weakening of Scottish royal authority in Argyll. Such outside influence in Argyll may be evidenced by Scottish royal acta. Specifically, one royal charter, dating to 1141×1147, reveals that David granted a portion of his cáin from Argyll and Kintyre to Holyrood Abbey. Another charter, dating to 1145×1153, shows that the king granted a portion of his cáin from Argyll of Moray, and other revenue from Argyll, to Urquhart Priory. Several years later, in 1150×1152, David granted another portion of his cáin in Argyll and Kintyre to Dunfermline Abbey. The fact that this charter includes the caveat "in whatever year I should receive it" could indicate that, between 1141 and 1152, the Scottish Crown lost royal control of these territories to Somairle. Although David may well have regarded Argyll as a Scottish tributary, Somairle's ensuing career clearly reveals that the latter regarded himself a fully independent ruler. Somairle's first attestation by a contemporary source occurs in 1153, when the Chronicle of Holyrood reports that he backed the cause of his , the Meic Máel Coluim, in an unsuccessful coup after David's death. These —possibly nephews or grandsons of Somairle—were the sons of Máel Coluim mac Alasdair, a claimant to the Scottish throne, descended from an elder brother of David, Alexander I, King of Scotland. There is reason to suspect that some of the campaigning conducted by Somairle and the Meic Máel Coluim is also evinced by Carmen de Morte Sumerledi, which refers to his wasting of Glasgow, its cathedral, and surrounding countryside. Upon the collapse of the uprising, Somairle apparently abandoned the Meic Máel Coluim, whereupon he turned his energies towards the Isles. By Christmas 1160, a Scottish royal charter reveals that Somairle had come to an understanding of peace with Malcolm at some point earlier that year. Nevertheless, four years later Somairle launched his final invasion of Scotland, and it is possible that it was conducted in the context of another attempt to support Máel Coluim's claim to the Scottish throne.

Another possibility is that Somairle was attempting to secure a swathe of territory that had only recently been secured by the Scottish Crown. Although there is no record of Somairle before 1153, his family was evidently involved in an earlier insurrection by Máel Coluim against David that ended with Máel Coluim's capture and imprisonment in 1134. An aftereffect of this failed insurgency may be perceptible in a Scottish royal charter issued at Cadzow in about 1136. This source records the Scottish Crown's claim to cáin in Carrick, Kyle, Cunningham, and Strathgryfe. Historically, this region appears to have once formed part of the territory dominated by the Gall Gaidheil, a people of mixed Scandinavian and Gaelic ethnicity. One possibility is that these lands had formerly comprised part of a Gall Gaidheil realm before the Scottish Crown overcame Máel Coluim and his supporters. The Cadzow charter is one of several that mark the earliest record of Fergus, Lord of Galloway, a Scandinavian-Gaelic magnate who held lands in Carrick. Fergus' attestation could indicate that, whilst Somairle's family may have suffered marginalisation as a result of Máel Coluim's defeat and David's consolidation of the region, Fergus and his family could have conversely profited at this time as supporters of David's cause. The record of Fergus amongst the Scottish elite at Cadzow is certainly evidence of the increasing reach of David's royal authority in the 1130s.

Another figure first attested by these charters is Walter, a man who may have been granted the lands of Strathgryfe, Renfrew, Mearns, and North Kyle on the occasion of David's grant of cáin. One explanation for Somairle's invasion is that he may have been compelled to counter a threat that Walter—and other recently-enfeoffed Scottish magnates—posed to his authority. A catalyst of this collision of competing spheres of influence may have been the vacuum left by Óláfr's assassination. Although the political uncertainty following Óláfr's elimination would have certainly posed a threat to the Scots, the concurrent build-up of Scottish power along the western seaboard—particularly exemplified by Walter's expansive territorial grants in the region—meant that the Scots were also positioned to capitalise upon the situation. In fact, there is reason to suspect that, during Malcolm's reign—and perhaps with Malcolm's consent—Walter began to extend his own authority into the Firth of Clyde, the islands of the Clyde, the southern shores of Cowal, and the fringes of Argyll. The allotment of Scottish fiefs along the western seaboard suggests that these lands were settled in the context of defending the Scottish realm from external threats in Galloway and the Isles. It was probably in this context that substantial western lordships were granted to men such as Hugh de Morville, Robert de Brus, and Walter himself. As such, the mid-part of the twelfth century saw a steady consolidation of Scottish power along the western seaboard by some of the realm's greatest magnates—men who could well have encroached into Somairle's sphere of influence. The continuous encroachment of Scottish authority may well have spurned Somairle to launch a counter-strike. It is conceivable that Somairle first acquired the islands of the Firth of Clyde after his 1156 clash with Guðrøðr. In so doing, Somairle gained control of islands in a territory that appears to have been regarded by the Scots as vital to their own security. In fact, the catalyst for the establishment of Scottish castles along the River Clyde could well have been the potential threat posed by Somairle.

Somairle's final campaign appears similar to later Norwegian-backed invasions of the Firth of Clyde conducted by his descendants in the thirteenth century (1230 and 1263). In fact, the Viking sack of Alt Clut in 870 may parallel these invasions, since it is possible that Dublin-based Vikings destroyed the fortress of Alt Clut (Dumbarton Castle) in an effort to nullify a threat posed by the Strathclyde Britons. Another factor that may have spurned Somairle to attack the Scots could have been Malcolm's increasingly poor health. Certainly, the Chronicle of Melrose states that the Scottish king was stricken with a "great sickness" in 1163, and it is possible that he never fully recovered. The fact that the Annals of Ulster accords Malcolm the epithet "Cennmor" ("Big Head") upon his death could be evidence that he suffered from Paget's disease. One possibility is that the king's impairment was opportunistically seized upon by Somairle, who overestimated a weakening in Scottish royal power.

Aftermath

Although it is conceivable that Dubgall was able to secure power following his father's demise, it is evident from the Chronicle of Mann that the kingship of Mann was soon seized by Guðrøðr's brother, Rǫgnvaldr. Before the end of the year, Guðrøðr is said by the same source to have arrived in the Isles, and ruthlessly overpowered his brother. Guðrøðr thereafter regained the kingship, and the realm was divided between him and Clann Somairle, in a partitioning that stemmed from Somairle's coup in 1156. Although there is no direct evidence that Somairle's imperium fragmented upon his death, there is reason to suspect that it was indeed divided between his sons. In the decades that followed Somairle's demise, there is evidence to suggest that the known inter-dynastic infighting amongst his descendants was capitalised upon by Walter and his family.

Queen Blearie's Stone

There are several local traditions concerning the location of the battle. One account, dating to the late eighteenth century, asserts that the invaders landed at Renfrew, and that they marched southwards to Knock, an elevated land form situated between Renfrew and Glasgow, where they were defeated by local forces. In 1772, Thomas Pennant visited this site, and observed "a mount or tumulus, with a foss round the base, and a single stone on the top", which he was led to believe marked the spot where Somairle was defeated.

Earlier accounts of the monument accorded it forms of the name "Queen Blearie's Stone", and associated it with accounts linking it to the death of Marjorie Bruce, and the caesarean birth of her son, Robert II, King of Scotland. Pennant's account may have been influenced by David Dalrymple, who suggested that this name may mask a Gaelic toponym—which he gave as Cuiné Blair ("Memorial of Battle")—a name that actually referred to the Battle of Renfrew. If the monument was indeed associated with the battle, it could be identical to the pillar pictured upon Walter's seal. If so, the seal's depiction of a man leaning against a pillar could commemorate the Scottish victory. In any case, "Queen Blearie's Stone" was demolished before the end of the eighteenth century. By this point, part of it evidently formed a lintel of a barn door, although by the mid nineteenth century it disappeared. The approximate site of "Queen Blearie's Stone" is now part of a housing estate.

Notes

Citations

References

Primary sources

Secondary sources

 
 
 
 
 
 
 
 
 
 
 
 
 
 
 
 
 
 
 
 
 
 
 
 
 
 
 
 
 
 
 
 
 
 
 
 
 
 
 
 
 
 
 
 
 
 
 
 
 
 
 
 
 
 
 
 
 
 
 
 
 
 
 
 
 
 
 
 
 
 
 
 
 
 
 
 
 
 
 
 
 
 
 
 
 
 
 
 
 
 
 
 
 
 
 
 
 
 
 
 
 
 
 
 
 
 
 
 
 
 
 
 
 
 
 
 
 
 
 
 
 
 
 
 
 
 
 
 
 
 
 
 
 

12th century in Scotland
Renfrew
1164 in Scotland
Renfrew
Renfrew
Conflicts in 1164
Scandinavian Scotland
Renfrew
History of Renfrewshire
Kingdom of the Isles